Amaranthus bigelovii is a flowering plant commonly known as Bigelow's amaranth.  It is an annual plant native to New Mexico, Texas, and Louisiana.

References

bigelovii
Flora of the South-Central United States
Flora of the Southeastern United States
Flora without expected TNC conservation status